Martin Seth Kramer (Hebrew: מרטין קרמר; born September 9, 1954, Washington, D.C.) is an American-Israeli scholar of the Middle East at Tel Aviv University and the Washington Institute for Near East Policy. His focus is on the history and politics of the Middle East, contemporary Islam, and modern Israel.

Education
Kramer began his undergraduate degree under Itamar Rabinovich in Middle Eastern Studies at Tel Aviv University and completed his BA in Near Eastern Studies from Princeton University. He earned his PhD at Princeton as well, under Fouad Ajami, L. Carl Brown, Charles Issawi, and Bernard Lewis, who directed his thesis. He also received a History MA from Columbia University.

Tel Aviv University, 1971-73 – Middle Eastern Studies
BA Princeton University, 1975 (summa cum laude) – Near Eastern Studies
MA Columbia University, 1976 – History
MA Princeton University, 1978 – Near Eastern Studies
PhD Princeton University, 1982 – Near Eastern Studies

Career

Martin Kramer is a historian at Tel Aviv University and the Walter P. Stern fellow at the Washington Institute for Near East Policy. He was the founding president of Shalem College in Jerusalem, and first chair of its Middle East and Islamic studies program.

Kramer has taught as a visiting professor at Brandeis University, the University of Chicago, Cornell University, Georgetown University, and The Johns Hopkins University (SAIS). He has also served as a visiting fellow at the Woodrow Wilson International Center for Scholars in Washington and Harvard University's Olin Institute for Strategic Studies.

Kramer is a senior and past editor of the Middle East Forum's Middle East Quarterly. Primarily a scholar of twentieth century Islamist intellectual and political history, Kramer has also published columns in the National Review magazine and on the websites of the History News Network.

Political involvement
Kramer was an early advocate of attacking Saddam Hussein in the wake of 9/11, arguing in December 2001 that regardless of a possible involvement, he posed a threat to the entire Middle East. However, he was critical of the shifting rationale for the war in October 2002, questioning the United States' "tools of social engineering" needed to promote an eventual democracy process in the Arab world.

He was a senior policy adviser on the Middle East to the Rudy Giuliani Presidential Campaign in 2007.

Critique of Middle Eastern studies 

Kramer is a critic of Middle Eastern studies programs in the United States which he thinks are left-wing and backed with poor scholarship.

Ivory Towers on Sand 
In 2001, the Washington Institute for Near East Policy published Kramer's book Ivory Towers on Sand: The Failure of Middle Eastern Studies in America. In the book (as reported by the New York Times), Kramer argued that Middle East experts "failed to ask the right questions at the right time about Islam. They underestimated its impact in the 1980s; they misrepresented its role in the early 1990s; and they glossed over its growing potential for terrorism against America in the late 1990s."The book was given positive mentions in The Chronicle of Higher Education and The Washington Post

John L. Esposito accused Kramer of trying to discredit the entire Middle East establishment. Zachary Lockman, professor of modern Middle East history at New York University, admits that Kramer's criticism of Middle East scholars' general failure to anticipate the rise of Islamist movements in the 1970s is well-deserved but maintains that "[o]verall, Kramer’s approach is deeply flawed as a history of Middle East studies as a scholarly field."

HR 3077 

Kramer was one of the most vocal supporters of HR 3077, a bill in the United States House of Representatives designed to reform area studies in the US. Saree Makdisi argues in a Los Angeles Times op-ed that the bill "poses a profound threat to academic freedom".

Palestinian aid controversy
At the February 2010 Herzliya Conference in Israel, Kramer caused controversy by advocating for the elimination of Western aid in what he termed "pro-natal subsidies" to Palestinian refugees in Gaza in order to discourage population growth and Islamic radicalization:

At the time, he was a National Security Studies Program Visiting Scholar at the Weatherhead Center for International Affairs, Harvard University, and some critics called on Harvard to distance itself from him. Deans at Harvard University's Weatherhead Center for International Affairs rejected these calls, stating, "Accusations have been made that Martin Kramer's statements are genocidal. These accusations are baseless." They found that Kramer's critics "appear not to understand the role of controversy in an academic setting" and rejected any attempts to restrict "fundamental academic freedom." Kramer later referred to the speech as "experimental" and deliberately "provocative."

Bibliography

Books
 Political Islam (1980) 
 Islam Assembled (1985) 
 Shi'ism, Resistance, and Revolution (1987) 
 Hezbollah's Vision of the West (1989) 
 Middle Eastern Lives: The Practice of Biography and Self-Narrative (Contemporary Issues in the Middle East) (1991) 
 Arab Awakening and Islamic Revival: The Politics of Ideas in the Middle East (1996) 
 The Islamism Debate (1997) 
 The Jewish Discovery of Islam (1999) 
 Ivory Towers on Sand: The Failure of Middle Eastern Studies in America (2001) , download
 The War on Error: Israel, Islam, and the Middle East (2016)

Journal Papers
 "The American Interest", Azure magazine, Autumn 2006.
 "Nation and Assassination in the Middle East", Middle East Quarterly, Summer 2004.
 "Coming to Terms: Fundamentalists or Islamists?", Middle East Quarterly, Summer 2003.
 "Policy and the Academy: An Illicit Relationship?", Middle East Quarterly, Winter 2003.

Kramer on interpreters of the Middle East
 Pape-Kramer debate - a debate involving Robert Pape and Kramer
 Suicide Terrorism in the Middle East: Origins and Response Robert Pape
 Islam Obscured, Kramer on John Esposito
Stephen Walt's World, a critique of Stephen Walt
The Arab Nation of Shakib Arslan by Kramer, a critique of Shakib Arslan 31 October 1987
 Albert Pasha: criticism of Albert Hourani by Kramer 15 June 2002
 Islamist Bubbles, an assessment of Gilles Kepel.
 Arab Pen, English Purse: John Sabunji and Wilfrid Scawen Blunt, a critique of Wilfrid Scawen Blunt by Kramer 31 December 1989
 Ignatieff's Empire, criticism of Michael Ignatieff January 5, 2003
 The Day the Rabbi Rescued Rashid, a critique of Arthur Hertzberg 28 February 2005

Kramer on Key Middle Eastern Figures
 The Oracle of Hizbullah (Hezbollah): Sayyid Muhammad Husayn (Hussein) Fadlallah

Kramer on U.S. and Israeli Policy
 What Do the Financial Crisis and US Middle East Policy Have in Common? December 2008.
 Israel's Gaza Strategy  January 2009.
 Sanctioning "Resistance" January 2009.

Kramer on the Zionist legacy of Martin Luther King Jr.
 The MLK Day Bundle 17 January 2021.
 Martin Luther King Jr. and Israel, then and now January 2020, Times of Israel
 In the Words of Martin Luther King Jr. chapter in The War on Error: Israel, Islam, and the Middle East (New Brunswick, NJ:Transaction, 2016), 253-67.
 Where MLK really stood on Israel and the Palestinians 2019. Mosaic Magazine

References

External links
 Martin Kramer's website
 Martin Kramer's blog
 Kramer's entry with the Washington Institute for Near East Policy
 Kramer about Obama and the Middle East

1954 births
Jewish American journalists
American male journalists
Middle Eastern studies in the United States
American political scientists
Columbia Graduate School of Arts and Sciences alumni
Harvard Fellows
Islam and politics
Living people
Middle East Forum
Princeton University alumni
Tel Aviv University
The Washington Institute for Near East Policy
21st-century American Jews